Jordan Marsh (officially Jordan Marsh & Company) was an American department store chain that was headquartered in Boston, Massachusetts, and operated throughout New England. It was founded by Eben Dyer Jordan and Benjamin L. Marsh in 1841. The ownership of Jordan Marsh was transferred between several holding companies during its operation, including Hahn Department Stores in 1928, Allied Stores in 1935, and Federated Department Stores in 1988. The brand was retired and most stores were converted into the New York City-based Macy's in 1996.

Allied also operated a separate group of stores in Florida called Jordan Marsh Florida, which was disbanded in 1991.

History

Beginnings 

In 1841, Eben Dyer Jordan left his job at a Boston dry goods store and went into business for himself, laying the foundation for the first Jordan Marsh. Ten years later, Jordan partnered with Boston merchant Benjamin L. Marsh.  They began by selling linen, silk, and other dry goods from Europe to wholesale customers in and around the city. As the business grew, it moved from one location to another and in 1861 Jordan and Marsh decided to begin selling directly to the public. They acquired a brownstone building at 450 Washington Street, in the heart of what is still Boston's downtown shopping district. After the American Civil War, Jordan and Marsh expanded into nearby buildings, offering an increasing quantity and variety of goods. Eventually the partners had established the nation's first "departmentalized" store and called it Jordan Marsh and Company. During the second half of the 19th century, Eben Jordan's son, Jordan Jr., and a new partner named George Mitton took over the company, turning it into a modern department store.

Jordan Marsh and Company, in addition to establishing the first department store, introduced the concept of “department shopping.”  Jordan Marsh combined an elegant atmosphere with excellent personal service and a wide range of merchandise. With many different departments displaying wares from around the world, the store drew shoppers from the city as well from the growing "streetcar suburbs." Once at the store, consumers could do more than just shop. Jordan Marsh offered fashion shows, a bakery famous for its blueberry muffins, art exhibitions, and even afternoon concerts.

Jordan Marsh also pioneered new services for shoppers not available in more traditional specialty shops. Most important, it offered credit, usually in the form of charge accounts.  It introduced the customer-is-always right policy, and offered money-back guarantees. Jordan Marsh was always known for implementing new technology as well, one of the first stores to feature electrical lights, glass showcases, telephones, and elevators. It also installed pneumatic tubes that delivered cash and credit information to individual departments.

In 1935, Boston's Jordan Marsh became one of the founders of New York City-based Allied Stores Corporation, a successor to Hahn Department Stores, Inc., a holding company founded in 1928.

Expansion 

After World War II, the management of Jordan Marsh announced that it would build a new store in downtown Boston. Jordan's five older buildings would give way to a new building that would take up a full city block. Covering an area larger than Harvard Stadium, it would have two stories under ground; another 14 would rise into the air. It would have all the latest technology, including air conditioning, automatic doorways, block-long show windows, and radiant-heated sidewalks. After the addition of the "new building" in 1949, the Jordan Marsh Complex was split into four distinct units; the 1949 new store, the original main store, annex, and bristol building. At the same time, the company began moving, along with its customers, into the suburbs. Jordan's constructed its first branch stores in older suburban communities in the 1940s, but by 1966 the branch stores accounted for half of all department store sales.

The shopping mall Shopper's World opened in Framingham, Massachusetts on October 4, 1951, making it one of the earliest suburban shopping malls in the country.  Jordan Marsh stood at the southern end as the sole anchor. It was the first mall-styled Jordan Marsh in the country and was unmistakable for its large white dome. The dome was visible from the air and was used on aeronautical charts as a visual reporting point for aircraft approaching Boston's Logan Airport.  It was reputed to be the third largest (in diameter) unsupported dome in the world after St. Peter's Basilica in Rome and St. Paul's Cathedral in London.  The Shopper's World store quickly became the most recognizable Jordan Marsh outside the flagship store in Boston.

In 1956, the first store in Miami, Florida was opened with slogans such as "Florida's high fashion department store" and "the store with the Florida flair".  Later, it was divided into a separate division of Allied then the Jordan Marsh of Boston with headquarters in Miami. With newcomers heading into the state, the store lost focus and decided to downgrade in order to compete. Jordan Marsh also opened a San Diego branch around the same time, occupying the former Sears store downtown. The branch did not do nearly as well as the Florida branches and the failed store closed in 1958. The Florida stores were disbanded in 1991, with several being merged with Maas Brothers, which later became Burdines, now Macy's.

The main building of Boston's Jordan Marsh complex, an ornate brownstone edifice with a landmark corner clock tower designed by Nathaniel J. Bradlee in the 1860s, was torn down in 1975, along with its entire row of historic annex buildings. Local architect Leslie Larson founded a coalition called the City Conservation League to try to save the main building, which made way for a low modern brick structure that sits there today as Macy's. Some outraged customers cut up their credit cards in protest of the demolition. These protests and preservationist grassroots efforts led to the creation of the Boston Landmarks Commission.

In 1986, the Canadian Campeau Corporation acquired Allied Stores Corporation, which was reorganized under the merger agreement.  In February 1987, Campeau merged D.M. Read Co. of Bridgeport, Connecticut, into Jordan Marsh, and merged Jordan Marsh Florida with Maas Brothers of Tampa, Florida, as the new Maas Brothers/Jordan Marsh Florida division.

In 1988, Campeau Corporation acquired Federated Department Stores.  To consolidate with Federated, Allied's New York headquarters moved to Cincinnati. Allied Stores: The Bon Marché, Jordan Marsh, Maas Brothers/Jordan Marsh Florida and Stern's, operating in tandem with Federated:  Bloomingdale's, Abraham & Straus, Lazarus, Rich's, Goldsmith's, and Burdines.

Closing 
In 1990, saddled by debt resulting from the highly leveraged Campeau takeover of Federated, both Federated and Allied filed for bankruptcy. Campeau Corp. U.S., Inc., was renamed Federated Stores, Inc. The operations of Jordan Marsh Florida and Maas Brothers were absorbed by Burdines in 1991.

In 1992, a new public company, Federated Department Stores, Inc., emerged in February. The former Allied Stores Corporation was merged into Federated. A consolidation of the A&S and Jordan Marsh divisions resulted in the A&S/Jordan Marsh division, headquartered in Brooklyn, New York. In 1994, the A&S/Jordan Marsh division merged with Macy's East and the A&S stores were renamed Macy's in 1995. In 1996, Jordan Marsh stores in the Northeast U.S., already part of the Macy's East division, were converted to the Macy's nameplate.

Enchanted Village 
From the 1940s until 1972—and again in the early 1990s—the Jordan Marsh flagship store in Boston's Downtown Crossing was home to the Enchanted Village, a lavish Christmas display which at its height took over an entire floor of the department store and was also spotlighted in its display windows. The centerpiece of the display, besides Santa, was an eight-set Lionel electric train display. From what started as a marketing gimmick, the Enchanted Village quickly became a legendary Boston tradition and an annual mainstay of the city's holiday season. Macy's discontinued the Enchanted Village in 1998 when it was moved to City Hall Plaza. More recently it has been housed in the Hynes Convention Center.

On June 16, 2009, the Enchanted Village, including all props and figures was sold at auction, as the City of Boston could no longer afford to be a major sponsor of the annual event. It was sold to Jordan's Furniture (which is a unit of Warren Buffett's Berkshire Hathaway and had no connection to the former Jordan Marsh), and is on display during the holiday season at the Avon, Massachusetts, location.

See also
 Adriatic Mills, a Worcester, Massachusetts, textile mill owned by Jordan Marsh
 Jordan Hall,  was built with major funding from one of the Jordan family
 Jordan Marsh Co. v. Commissioner

References

Further reading 
 
 
 Jordan, Marsh Illustrated Catalogue of 1891 (Dover Publications reprint, 1991).
 Tales of the Observer, by Richard H. Edwards, Jr. (Jordan Marsh Company, 1950).

External links

 Blog about memories of shopping in Boston 
 A Last Look at Boston's Enchanted Village 2005

American companies established in 1841
Defunct department stores based in Massachusetts
Companies based in Boston
Retail companies disestablished in 1996
Defunct companies based in Massachusetts
Macy's, Inc.
1841 establishments in Massachusetts
Retail companies established in 1841
American companies disestablished in 1996
Companies that filed for Chapter 11 bankruptcy in 1990